Porzecze  is a village in the administrative district of Gmina Boleszkowice, within Myślibórz County, West Pomeranian Voivodeship, in north-western Poland, close to the German border.

See also
 History of Pomerania

References

Villages in Myślibórz County